Parrya is a genus of flowering plants in the family Brassicaceae, found in the arctic and subarctic biomes of the Northern Hemisphere, and in Central Asia. The center of diversity is the Tian Shan and Pamir-Alay mountain ranges.

Species
The following species are accepted:
Parrya alba 
Parrya albida 
Parrya arctica 
Parrya asperrima 
Parrya australis 
Parrya darvazica 
Parrya fruticulosa 
Parrya glabra 
Parrya gracillima 
Parrya hispida 
Parrya junussovii 
Parrya khorasanica 
Parrya kuramensis 
Parrya lancifolia 
Parrya longicarpa 
Parrya maidantalica 
Parrya minjanensis 
Parrya mollissima 
Parrya nauruaq 
Parrya nudicaulis 
Parrya nuratensis 
Parrya olgae 
Parrya papillosa 
Parrya pavlovii 
Parrya pazijae 
Parrya pinnatifida 
Parrya pjataevae 
Parrya podlechii 
Parrya popovii 
Parrya pulvinata 
Parrya runcinata 
Parrya rydbergii 
Parrya sarawschanica 
Parrya saurica 
Parrya saxifraga 
Parrya schugnana 
Parrya stenocarpa 
Parrya subsiliquosa 
Parrya tschimganica 
Parrya turkestanica 
Parrya vvedenskyi

References

Brassicaceae
Brassicaceae genera